Pennsylvania State Senate District 13  includes parts of Berks County and Lancaster County. It is currently represented by Republican Scott Martin.

District profile
The district includes the following areas:

Berks County

 Brecknock Township
 Caernarvon Township
 New Morgan
 Robeson Township

Lancaster County

 Bart Township
 Caernarvon Township
 Christiana
 Colerain Township
 Conestoga Township
 Drumore Township
 East Drumore Township
 East Earl Township
 East Lampeter Township
 Eden Township
 Fulton Township
 Lancaster
 Lancaster Township
 Leacock Township
 Little Britain Township
 Manor Township
 Martic Township
 Millersville
 Paradise Township
 Pequea Township
 Providence Township
 Quarryville
 Sadsbury Township
 Salisbury Township
 Strasburg
 Strasburg Township
 Terre Hill
Upper Leacock Township
West Lampeter Township

Senators

Recent election results

References

Pennsylvania Senate districts
Government of Lancaster County, Pennsylvania